Nanxiashu station is a station of Line 1 of the Changzhou Metro, and the southern terminus of the line. It takes about 1 hour to the northern terminus Forest Park station. It started operations on 21 September 2019. 4 exits are available.

References

Changzhou Metro stations
Railway stations in Jiangsu
Railway stations in China opened in 2019